Ciaron Maurice Brown (born 14 January 1998) is a professional footballer who plays as a defender for  Oxford United and the Northern Ireland national football team. After playing non-League football, Brown signed for Cardiff City in 2018 and made his professional debut for Livingston during a loan spell the following year.

Club career

Early career 
Brown enjoyed a stint at amateur side Bedfont Sports before moving to National League South club Wealdstone. He made over 50 appearances for the Ruislip-based club, scoring twice.

Cardiff City 
After a successful trial period, Brown was signed by Cardiff City on 9 January 2018. He was an unused substitute in Cardiff's 3–1 defeat to Norwich City in the EFL Cup.

On 24 January 2019, Livingston confirmed the signing of Brown on loan from Cardiff. He played his first league game on 23 February 2019, playing 63 minutes against Kilmarnock. He was again loaned to Livingston in January 2020. On 21 July 2020, he rejoined Livingston on a one-year loan, making his third spell at the club. On 31 January 2021, Brown was recalled following an impressive string of displays.

On 31 January 2022, Brown joined EFL League One club Oxford United on loan until the end of the 2021–22 season. On June 10, 2022, Cardiff announced Brown would leave the club when his contract expired on June 30.

Oxford United 
On 26 June 2022, Brown would sign with Oxford United on a two-year deal.

In January 2023, The Football Association opened an investigation into suspicious betting patterns related to the booking of Brown in Oxford's FA Cup defeat against Arsenal on 9 January 2023.

International career
Born in the London Borough of Hillingdon, he qualifies for Northern Ireland through his mother, who is from Belfast. In September 2019, he was called up to the under-21 side for the 2021 UEFA European Under-21 Championship qualifiers against Malta and Finland. Six days later he was drafted into the senior squad and made his debut against Luxembourg in a friendly.

Career statistics

Club

References

External links 

Living people
1998 births
English people of Northern Ireland descent
English footballers
Association footballers from Northern Ireland
Northern Ireland international footballers
Footballers from Hillingdon
Association football defenders
Bedfont Sports F.C. players
Wealdstone F.C. players
Cardiff City F.C. players
Livingston F.C. players
Oxford United F.C. players
Isthmian League players
National League (English football) players
Scottish Professional Football League players
English Football League players